Kunandarkoil block is a revenue block in Pudukkottai district, Tamil Nadu, India. It has a total of 37 panchayat villages.

Villages of Kunandarkoil Block 
1.	Andakulam 
2.	Chettipatti 
3.	Kannagudi 
4.	Killanur  
5.	Killukottai 
6.	Killukulavaipatti  
7.	Koppampatti 
8.	Kulathur, Pudukkottai 
9.	Lekkanapatti  
10.	Mangathevanpatti 
11.	Melapuduvayal 
12.	Minnathur  
13.	Mootampatti 
14.	Nanjur 
15.	Odugampatti  
16.	Odukoor 
17.	Pallathupatti 
18.	Papudaiyanpatti  
19.	Perambur, Pudukkottai 
20.	Periyathambiudaiyanpatti 
21.	Puliyur, Pudukkottai  
22.	Rakkathampatti 
23.	Senaiyakudi 
24.	Sengalur  
25.	T.keelaiyur 
26.	Thayinipatti 
27.	Themmavur  
28.	Thennangudi 
29.	Udayalipatti 
30.	Uppiliyakudi  
31.	Vaithur 
32.	Valamangalam 
33.	Valiyampatti  
34.	Vathanakottai 
35.	Vathanakuruchi 
36.	Veerakkudi  
37.	Visalur, Pudukkottai

References 

 

Revenue blocks of Pudukkottai district